Subdivision is a 2009 Australian film directed by Sue Brooks and starring Gary Sweet, Brooke Satchwell, Bruce Spence, Kris McQuade, Ashley Bradnam, Aaron Fa'aoso. It was released on 20 August 2009 throughout Australia.

Subdivision was distributed in Australia and New Zealand by Walt Disney Studios Motion Pictures under the Buena Vista International label with Lightning Entertainment handling the international distribution.

Plot
Subdivision is a comedy/drama which focuses on the change a community goes through when city developers take over. The plot centres around Digger Kelly and his son Jack, both carpenters who build homes in Hervey Bay. Their world is turned upside down when a southern property developer led by hot young executive Tiffany moves into town.

Cast
Ashley Bradnam .... Jack Kelly
Brooke Satchwell .... Tiffany
Gary Sweet .... Digger Kelly
Aaron Fa'aoso .... Solly
Bruce Spence .... Singlet
Denise Roberts .... Faye
Kris McQuade .... Betty Kelly
Steve Bisley .... Harry
James Stewart .... Brett
Kathryn Beck .... Dale Kelly
John Batchelor .... Pete
Petta Robertson .... Sue

Box office
Subdivision grossed $206,350 at the box office in Australia.

See also
Cinema of Australia

References

External links
Movie Casting This Weekend
Disney shifts Subdivision release to August

2009 films
2009 comedy-drama films
Films directed by Sue Brooks
2009 comedy films
2009 drama films
Australian comedy-drama films
Films set in Queensland
Films shot in Queensland
2000s English-language films
2000s Australian films
Buena Vista International films